Flight 671 may refer to:

Avianca Flight 671, crashed on 21 January 1960
Air Wisconsin Flight 671, mid-air collision on 29 June 1972
Trans-Air Service Flight 671, engine failure on 31 March 1992

0671